Salem Mohamed Attiaallah (born 1 October 1993) is an Egyptian track and field athlete who specializes in the 3000 metres steeplechase. In 2019, he competed in the men's 3000 metres steeplechase at the 2019 World Athletics Championships held in Doha, Qatar. He did not qualify to compete in the final.

Career 

In 2018, he competed in the men's half marathon at the 2018 IAAF World Half Marathon Championships held in Valencia, Spain. He finished in 120th place.

In 2019, he represented Egypt at the 2019 African Games held in Rabat, Morocco. He competed in the men's 3000 metres steeplechase and he finished in 7th place.

References

External links 
 

Living people
1993 births
Place of birth missing (living people)
Egyptian male long-distance runners
Egyptian male steeplechase runners
World Athletics Championships athletes for Egypt
Athletes (track and field) at the 2019 African Games
African Games competitors for Egypt
21st-century Egyptian people